Elivagar Flumina is a network of river channels ranging from 23 km to 210 km in length in the region around the Menrva Crater of Titan. The channel system is at least 120 km wide and shows signs of erosion. At its mouth, an alluvial fan is present. The Elivagar Flumina is interpreted as alluvial due to its closeness to fluvial valleys and as understood from the radar backscatter. Geomorphologic mapping of the Menrva region of Titan has yielded evidence for exogenic processes such as hydrocarbon fluid channelization (in other words flash floods) that are thought to have formed the Flumina network.

The Elivagar Flumina is named after the Élivágar, a group of poisonous ice rivers in Norse mythology.

References

Surface features of Titan (moon)